Botrytis may refer to:
Botrytis (fungus), the anamorphs of fungi of the genus Botryotinia
Botrytis cinerea, a mold important in wine making
Botrytis, the cauliflower cultivar group of Brassica oleracea